Eduardo Colcenti Antunes (born 24 February 1992), known as Eduardo Sasha or simply Sasha, is a Brazilian footballer who plays as a forward for Atlético Mineiro.

He made his professional debut for Internacional in 2010, and has won the Campeonato Gaúcho four times for the club. He spent 18 months on loan at Goiás, where he won the Campeonato Brasileiro Série B and the Campeonato Goiano. In 2017 he moved to Santos.

Career

Internacional
Born in Porto Alegre, Rio Grande do Sul; due to his style of hair in his youth, and his brother already being nicknamed after Brazilian presenter Xuxa, he earned the sobriquet Sasha after her daughter Sasha Meneghel.

He began his career at hometown team Internacional. On 10 September 2010, aged 18, he signed his first contract for a length of five years, with a release clause set at €40 million (R$ 87 million). Two days later, he made his debut in a goalless home draw against Goiás for the year's Campeonato Brasileiro Série A, as a 62nd-minute substitute for Giuliano. He made one more appearance off the bench over the season, and was included in Inters squad for the 2010 FIFA Club World Cup in the United Arab Emirates, but did not take to the field as his team came third.

On 19 March 2011, he made his Campeonato Gaúcho debut by replacing Daniel for the final six minutes of a goalless draw against Novo Hamburgo at Beira-Rio, his sole appearance of a season which his team ended as champions. He made two appearances the following season, including a first senior start on 26 January in a 1–2 home loss to Cerâmica.

Loan to Goiás
On 10 May 2012, Sasha was loaned to Goiás for the upcoming Série B season; he was the team's 17th signing of the year and the fifth from Internacional, including his youth team strike partner Ricardo Goulart. He made seven substitute appearances as his team won the championship.

On 23 January 2013, as a half-time replacement for Caio in the second game of the year's Campeonato Goiano, he scored his first senior goal to give the Esmeraldino the lead in an eventual 3–1 win at Grêmio Anápolis. He totalled three goals in 21 appearances as his team won the state title, one coming in a 4–1 win (5–3 aggregate) at Aparecidense in the semi-finals on 5 May.

Later in the year, Sasha's four goals in 16 games helped Goiás to sixth place in the edition of the national league; his first such strike came on 18 September as a substitute for Renan Oliveira in a 2–2 draw at Coritiba. He totalled another three goals in eight games in the year's Copa do Brasil, including one in the semi-final defeat to Flamengo.

Return to Internacional

Sasha scored twice in seven games as the Colorado won the 2014 Campeonato Gaúcho; his first goal for them came on 29 January in a 2–1 home win over São Paulo-RS, three minutes after replacing Valdívia at the Estádio Francisco Stédile. He got another four in 12 games in the ensuing Série A, including two in a 4–2 home win over Coritiba on 28 September.

Internacional won another state championship the following year, with Sasha's contributions including a brace on 4 February in a 4–4 home draw against São José on 4 February 2015. He also got his first goals in continental competition, recording a goal in each game against Universidad de Chile in the second stage of the year's Copa Libertadores.

Sasha was the team's top scorer with six goals in 15 games as Inter won a sixth consecutive state title in 2016; he opened the 3–0 home win over Juventude in the second leg of the final (4–0 aggregate). On the celebration, he grabbed the corner flag and started dancing a debutante ball, eluding fierce rivals Grêmio's 15-year title drought; his dance later prompted to offensive replies by Luan on the 2016 Copa do Brasil and the 2017 Copa Libertadores Finals, both won by Grêmio.

Sasha was a regular starter for Inter during the campaign, as his side suffered relegation for the first time in history. In the following year's promotion season, he also struggled with recurrent ankle injuries.

Santos

On 9 January 2018, Sasha joined Santos on loan until December, with a buyout clause. He made his debut for the club on 22 January, coming on as a substitute in a 1–0 Campeonato Paulista home loss against Bragantino.

Sasha scored his first goal for Peixe on 25 January 2018, netting the equalizer in a 2–1 away defeat of Ponte Preta. On 15 March, he scored a brace in a 3–1 home win against Nacional, being also named man of the match.

On 19 April 2018, Sasha signed a permanent contract until 2022, with Zeca moving in the opposite direction. He started the 2019 campaign out of the first-team plans under new manager Jorge Sampaoli, but subsequently established himself as a regular.

On 20 July 2020, Sasha filed a legal action against Santos, alleging unpaid wages, and was declared a free agent eleven days later; the following day, however, the judge himself revoked the decision after being deemed suspect to judge the case.

Atlético Mineiro
On 17 August 2020, Sasha joined Atlético Mineiro on a four-year contract for a €1.5 million fee.

Style of play
Upon giving him his first professional contract, Internacional manager Celso Roth said of Sasha:

He is a boy who I have seen distinguishing himself in the reserves, a player with speed. Therefore, he's being added to the squad. He has speed, movement. We hope that, with calmness, with normal conditions, to give him the chance to mature. We have to be calm

Career statistics

Honours
Internacional
Campeonato Gaúcho: 2011, 2014, 2015, 2016

Goiás
Campeonato Brasileiro Série B: 2012
Campeonato Goiano: 2013

Atlético Mineiro
Campeonato Brasileiro Série A: 2021
Copa do Brasil: 2021
Campeonato Mineiro: 2020, 2021, 2022
Supercopa do Brasil: 2022

References

External links
 Profile on Internacional Official website 
 
 WebSoccerClub 

1992 births
Living people
Brazilian footballers
Footballers from Porto Alegre
Association football midfielders
Campeonato Brasileiro Série A players
Campeonato Brasileiro Série B players
Sport Club Internacional players
Goiás Esporte Clube players
Santos FC players
Clube Atlético Mineiro players